Sri Sai Vidyanikethan is an upper primary school located at Adapur village in Nandalur, near Kadapa in Andhra Pradesh, India. It was founded by Mr. and  Mrs. Nagireddy Subbareddy in 1996. It is reputed for its standards and the availability of the latest educational methods for all students not only near the village, but also for those who are far away.

A map of all schools in Nandalur mandal is available at Gmaps

References

Schools in Kadapa district
1996 establishments in Andhra Pradesh
Educational institutions established in 1996